Lemsford is a village and parish in Hertfordshire, England. It is near Welwyn Garden City and Hatfield and is in the Hatfield Villages Ward of the Borough of Welwyn/Hatfield.

Lemsford Springs is a small nature reserve. Its lagoons are important for birds such as the Green sandpiper.

The yearly Lemsford Fete garners thousands of visitors and is a traditional English country fete. Held at St. John's School and Church, activities include maypole dancing, raffles and live music.

History
The parish was created in 1858 out of the parish of Bishop's Hatfield. However, the settlement is older.

Buildings of interest

Lemsford Mill
Lemsford Mill, which is Grade II listed, is a 19th-century structure on the River Lea. It probably occupies the site of one of four mills at Hatfield which were recorded in the Domesday Book in 1086. It is now the headquarters of Ramblers Holidays, having been refurbished to provide office accommodation. It features a water wheel which generates electricity. The building was both regional and national winner of the British Council for Offices awards 2007 in the ‘small project’ category.

Brocket Hall and Lemsford church
In the 19th century when Lemsford became a separate parish, Brocket Hall, which is on the edge of Lemsford, was part of the Cowper estates.
The church was erected in 1859 as a memorial to the sixth Earl Cowper. It is Early English and Decorated in style, with a good east window, the latter also dedicated to the memory of the earl. The tower (west) is lofty and embattled.

People from Lemsford
The society osteopath Stephen Ward, a significant figure in the Profumo affair of 1963, was born at Lemsford in 1912. His father was the vicar of Lemsford.

References

External links

 Pictures of Lemsford (A Guide to Old Hertfordshire)

Villages in Hertfordshire
Hydroelectricity in England
Watermills mentioned in the Domesday Book